Tion Green (born December 14, 1993) is an American football running back who is currently a free agent. He played college football at Cincinnati, and signed with the Detroit Lions as an undrafted free agent in 2017.

Early years
Green attended and played high school football at Lake Brantley High School.

College career
Green attended and played college football for Cincinnati from 2012–2016. In the 2012 season, he had 16 carries for 70 yards and a touchdown. In the 2013 season, he had 91 carries for 412 yards and seven touchdowns. In the 2014 season, he had 28 carries for 118 yards and a touchdown. In the 2015 season, he had 151 carries for 729 yards and eight touchdowns. In the 2016 season, he had 159 carries for 743 yards and two touchdowns.

Collegiate statistics

Professional career

Detroit Lions
Green signed with the Detroit Lions as an undrafted free agent on May 12, 2017.

On December 3, 2017, Green made his NFL debut against the Baltimore Ravens and had 11 carries for 51 yards and a touchdown. On Christmas Eve, against the Cincinnati Bengals, he scored his second touchdown. Overall, he finished his rookie season with 42 carries for 165 yards and two touchdowns.

On May 10, 2018, Green was waived by the Lions.

Indianapolis Colts
On August 14, 2018, Green signed with the Indianapolis Colts, but was waived six days later. He was re-signed on August 22, 2018, but waived again five days later.

References

External links

Cincinnati Bearcats bio

1993 births
Living people
American football running backs
Cincinnati Bearcats football players
Detroit Lions players
Indianapolis Colts players
Lake Brantley High School alumni
Sportspeople from Sanford, Florida